Renanthera coccinea is a species of orchid occurring from Hainan to Indochina. It is the type species of the genus Renanthera.

References 

coccinea
Orchids of China
Flora of Hainan